Jahmal Justin Hector-Ingram (born 11 November 1998) is an English professional footballer who plays for Hastings United. After beginning his career with Derby County, he played briefly for St Johnstone before his release at the end of the 2021-22 season.

Early life
Hector-Ingram was born in Upton Park, London.

Club career
Hector-Ingram started his career at West Ham United's academy, and joined Derby County in August 2019 following a successful trial.

He made his debut for Derby County as a substitute in a 2–0 away defeat to West Bromwich Albion on 8 July 2020. At the end of the 2019–20 Premier League 2 season he was nominated for the Player of the Season award after scoring 22 goals across all competitions prior to the early end to the season due to the COVID-19 pandemic.

On 1 February 2021, he joined Stevenage on loan until the end of the season. He was released by Derby at the end of the 2020–21 season.

On 1 February 2022, Hector-Ingram joined Scottish Premiership side St Johnstone on a free transfer until the end of the season. He departed the club at the end of the season.

On 2 December 2022, following a period of training at the club, Hector-Ingram joined Isthmian League side Hastings United on a permanent deal.

International career
Hector-Ingram has represented England at U16 and U17 level.

Career statistics

References

External links

1998 births
Living people
English footballers
Footballers from Upton Park, London
Association football forwards
Derby County F.C. players
Stevenage F.C. players
English Football League players
Black British sportspeople
England youth international footballers
St Johnstone F.C. players
Hastings United F.C. players